Wellmann is a German surname. Notable people with the surname include:

Allan Wellmann (born 1954), Guatemalan footballer
Ambera Wellmann (born 1982), Canadian artist
Dieter Wellmann (born 1942), German fencer
Ellen Wellmann (born 1948), German middle and long-distance runner
Ernst Wellmann (1904–1970), German Wehrmacht officer
Paul-Heinz Wellmann (born 1952), West German middle-distance runner

See also
Wellman (disambiguation)

German-language surnames